René Clément (18 March 1913 – 17 March 1996) was a French film director and screenwriter.

Life and career

Clément studied architecture at the École des Beaux-Arts where he developed an interest in filmmaking. In 1936, he directed his first film, a 20-minute short written by and featuring Jacques Tati. Clément spent the latter part of the 1930s making documentaries in parts of the Middle East and Africa. In 1937, he and archaeologist Jules Barthou were in Yemen making preparations to film a documentary, the first ever of that country and one that includes the only known film image of Imam Yahya.

Almost ten years passed before Clément directed a feature but his French Resistance film, La Bataille du rail (1945), gained much critical and commercial success. From there Clément became one of his country's most successful and respected directors, garnering numerous awards including two films that won the Academy Award for Best Foreign Language Film, the first in 1950 for The Walls of Malapaga (Au-delà des grilles) and the second time two years later for Forbidden Games (Jeux interdits). Clément had international success with several films but his star-studded 1966 epic Is Paris Burning?, written by Gore Vidal and Francis Ford Coppola and produced by Paul Graetz was a costly box office failure.

He began directing Play Dirty (a.k.a. Written in the Sand) but quit early in production due to disputes with the film's producer Harry Saltzman.

In 1973 he was a member of the jury at the 8th Moscow International Film Festival.

Clément continued to make a few films until his retirement in 1975, including an international success with Rider on the Rain that starred Charles Bronson and Marlène Jobert. In 1984 the French motion picture industry honored his lifetime contribution to film with a special César Award.

Clément's second wife was Irish-born screenwriter Johanna Harwood whom he had met on the set of his 1954 film Monsieur Ripois.

Clément died in 1996 and was buried in the local cemetery in Menton on the French Riviera where he had spent his years in retirement.

Partial list of awards
1946: International Jury Prize at the Cannes Film Festival - La Bataille du rail (Battle of the Rails)
1949: Cannes Film Festival Best Director award - Au-delà des grilles (The Walls of Malapaga)
1952: Lion d'or at the Venice Film Festival - Forbidden Games (Jeux interdits)
1952: New York Film Critics Circle Awards for Best Foreign Language Film - Forbidden Games (Jeux interdits)
1953: BAFTA Award for Best Film - Forbidden Games (Jeux interdits)
1954: Prix du jury at Cannes Film Festival - Monsieur Ripois (Lover Boy)
1956: Lion d'or at the Venice Film Festival - Gervaise
1956: BAFTA Award for Best Film - Gervaise

Films

Director
Soigne ton gauche, 1936
Paris la nuit, 1939
La Bataille du rail (Battle of the Rails), 1946
Le Père tranquille (Mr. Orchid), 1946
Les Maudits (The Damned), 1947
Au-delà des grilles (The Walls of Malapaga), 1949
Le Château de verre (Glass Castle), 1950
Jeux interdits (Forbidden Games), 1952
Monsieur Ripois (Knave of Hearts), 1954
Gervaise, 1956
This Angry Age (Barrage contre le Pacifique, La Diga sul Pacifico), 1958
Plein soleil (Purple Noon), 1960
Quelle joie de vivre (The Joy of Living, Che gioia vivere), 1961
Le Jour et l'Heure (The Day and the Hour), 1963
Les Félins (Love Cage/Joy House), 1964
Paris brûle-t-il? (Is Paris Burning?), 1966
Le Passager de la pluie (Rider on the Rain), 1969
La Maison sous les arbres (The Deadly Trap), 1971
 (...and Hope to Die), 1972
La Baby-Sitter (Wanted: Babysitter), 1975

Actor
Plein soleil (1960) - Le serveur maladroit (uncredited)
The Joy of Living (1963) - French General
Yoroppa tokkyu (1984) - (final film role)

References

External links
 

1913 births
1996 deaths
Mass media people from Bordeaux
École des Beaux-Arts alumni
French film directors
Directors of Best Foreign Language Film Academy Award winners
Directors of Palme d'Or winners
Directors of Golden Lion winners
Cannes Film Festival Award for Best Director winners
César Honorary Award recipients